Mario Trujillo García (January 21, 1920 – January 10, 2007) was a Mexican politician who served as Governor of Tabasco.

Trujillo served as deputy in the Lower House of the Mexican Congress. In 1971, after being elected, he took office as Governor of Tabasco (1971–1977).

Personal life 
He is survived by his two daughters, Georgina Trujillo and Graciela Trujillo.

References 

1920 births
2007 deaths
Institutional Revolutionary Party politicians
Members of the Chamber of Deputies (Mexico)
Governors of Tabasco
Politicians from Tabasco
20th-century Mexican politicians
People from Villahermosa